The following article is a summary of the 2007 football season in Kenya, the 44th competitive season in its history.

Premier League
The league was originally supposed to begin in autumn of 2006, but wrangles between two factions led to a parallel league situation. One of them, the Kenyan Premier League, had only seven teams, but were backed by FIFA. Remaining teams formed the KFFPL, supported by the Kenyan government. Teams affiliated to KPL were private clubs and company teams, such as Tusker, and teams owned by  non-governmental organizations, like sister clubs Mathare United and Mathare Youth, while teams affiliated to KFFPL were traditional community clubs like Gor Mahia, A.F.C. Leopards and Shabana Kisii, or teams belonging to government-owned organizations.

However, in March 2007, the two leagues were finally united into an 18-team league, though two teams, Mumias Sugar and Kangemi United, disbanded halfway through. The two relegated teams, A.F.C. Leopards and Shabana Kisii were not readmitted, although there were some calls for a larger 20-team league. This was in light of the equally controversial inclusion of Gor Mahia who had been expelled mid-season from the league in the previous season, and Mathare United, which had been relegated for fielding an ineligible player in ten matches.

The season finished in November 2007 with Tusker as the champions and Homegrown and Coast Stars relegated. Bandari and Western Stima gained promotion for the following season. Coast Stars appealed against the relegation to their financier Mohamed Hatimy, who also doubled up as the chairman of Kenya Football Federation. Hatimy's decision to reinstate the club was vetoed by FIFA following submissions by KPL.

Final table

President's Cup

The President's Cup was marred by the withdrawal of many leading teams. The cup was eventually won by Nationwide League side Sofapaka.

Since clubs from the Central African Republic, Chad, Kenya, Rwanda and Sierra Leone were disqualified for failure to fulfill their financial obligations, Sofapaka were unable to compete in the 2008 CAF Confederation Cup.

National team

Africa Cup of Nations
The national team finished the qualification phase of the 2008 Africa Cup of Nations third in its group and missed the final tournament. They had played two out of their six qualifying matches in 2006, which are included below.

CECAFA Cup
Kenya also competed in the 2007 CECAFA Cup. They reached the quarter-finals but lost 4-2 on penalties to Uganda.

Group stage

Quarter-finals

Other matches
The following is a list of other matches played by Kenya in 2007.

References

External links
RSSSF: Kenya 2007
Kenyan Premier League
Kenyan Footie - Kenyan Football Portal
Kenyafootball